Stigmella vittata is a moth of the family Nepticulidae. It is only known from Honshu in Japan.

Adults are on wing from early May. There are two to three generations per year.

The larvae feed on Salix species, including Salix gracilistyla. They mine the leaves of their host plant. The mine is a false blotch mine occurring on the upper-side of the leaf. It starts as thin linear gallery, often following a vein at least for a short distance. Here, the frass line is linear and occupies almost the whole mine-cavity. Later, it widens and becomes contorted, usually following a margin of the previous gallery. Thus the mine is often restricted to a small area and forms a false blotch. There are often several mines on a single leaf. The larva exits the mine by a semi-circular slit at the terminal end of mine.

External links
Japanese Species Of The Genus Stigmella (Nepticulidae: Lepidoptera)

Nepticulidae
Moths of Japan
Moths described in 1985